The canton of Savigny-le-Temple is a French administrative division that is in the arrondissement of Melun, in the Seine-et-Marne département (Île-de-France région).

Demographics

Composition 
At the French canton reorganisation which came into effect in March 2015, the canton was expanded from 3 to 6 communes:
Boissettes
Boissise-la-Bertrand
Cesson
Le Mée-sur-Seine
Savigny-le-Temple 
Vert-Saint-Denis

See also
Cantons of the Seine-et-Marne department
Communes of the Seine-et-Marne department

References

Savigny le temple